World Bowls is an international sport federation of Bowls. World Bowls is one of several bowls organisations that administer bowls around the world and is responsible for the sports premier event, the World Bowls Championship which historically was held every four years but from 2023 will take place every two years.

The organisation was founded in 2001 in an attempt to unite some of the multiple bowls bodies running the sport. The founding was a merger of previous organisations; the World Bowls Board and the International Women's Bowling Board.

In 2019, World Bowls came to an agreement with the International Indoor Bowls Council (IIBC), formerly the WIBC. The agreement was to merge their two international indoor championships, the World Cup Singles and the IIBC Championships. The new event would be called the World Bowls Indoor Championships. In 2021, Australian Darryl Clout was elected World Bowls President following the resignation of John Bell.

Events held by World Bowls
World Bowls Championship (outdoors), every two years
World Singles Champion of Champions (outdoors), annually
World Bowls Indoor Championships (indoors), annually

Rival organisations
Professional Bowls Association (PBA), (world governing body for Professional bowls players)
World Bowls Tour (subsidiary of the PBA, tasked with promoting indoor events including the World Indoor Bowls Championships)
International Indoor Bowls Council (IIBC), (formerly the WIBC and controlling body for the sport of Indoor Bowls worldwide)

World Bowls members
List as of April 2022:

 Africa:
  (Botswana BA)
  (Kenya BA)
  (Namibia BA)
  (Bowls South Africa)
  (Zambia BA)
  (Bowls Zimbabwe)

 Asia:
  (Brunei Darussalam LBA)
  (Chinese Multi Bowls Association)
  (Hong Kong LBA)
  (Bowling Federation of India)
  (Bowls Japan)
  (Macao Lawn Bowls General Association)
  (Malaysia LBF)
  (Pakistan Lawn Bowls Federation)
  (Philippine LBA)
  (Bowls Singapore)
  (Lawn Bowls Federation of Sri Lanka)
  (Lawn Bowls Association of Thailand)

 Oceania:
  (Bowls Australia)
  (Bowls Cook Island)
  (Bowls Fiji)
  (Bowls New Zealand)
  (Niue Lawn Bowls Association)
  (Norfolk Island Bowling Club & Bowls Council)
  (Bowls - PNG)
  (Samoan Bowling Association)
  (Tonga Lawn Bowls Federation) 

 Americas:
  (Federacion Argentina De Bowls)
  (Bowls Brazil)
  (Bowls Canada Boulingrin)
  Falkland Islands (Falkland Islands L.B.A)
  (Jamaica Lawn Bowling Association)
  (Bowls USA)

 Europe:
  (Bowls Cyprus)
  (Czech Bowls Association)
  (Bowls England)
  (Federation Francaise de Lawn Bowls)
  (German Bowls Federation)
  (Bowls Guernsey Association)
  (Bowls Hungary)
  Ireland, combined  (Irish BA)
  (Bowls Isle of Man)
  (Israel LBA)
  (Bowls Jersey)
  (Malta Lawn Bowls Federation)
  (Nederlandse Bowls Bond)
  (Bowls Portugal)
  (Bowls Scotland)
  (Lawn Bowls Spain)
  (Swedish Bowls Federation)
  (Swiss Bowls)
  (Turkish Bocce, Bowls, Bowling and Darts Federation)
  (Welsh Bowling Association)

Former Members: 
  (Swaziland Bowling Association)

Regions
53 Countries in 5 Zones (Updated at 12 April 2022).

See also
 World Bowls events

References

Bowling organizations
International sports organizations